Delta Phi Beta, established in 1992 at the University of California, Berkeley, is the United States' first South Asian fraternity. Delta Phi Beta is a co-ed South Asian Greek organization based on the pillars of community involvement, cultural awareness, academic excellence, and social enhancement.

Currently, there are chapters at the University of California, Los Angeles and at the University of California, Davis.

References

External links 
 Delta Phi Beta

Local fraternities and sororities
Student societies in the United States
Student organizations established in 1992
Fraternities and sororities in the United States
1992 establishments in California